Pakasit Saensook (born October 26, 1984) is a Thai retired professional footballer who plays as a right back.

Personal life
Pakasit has a brother Pavarit Saensook is also a footballer as a defender.

Honours

Club
Muangthong United
 Thai Premier League (2): 2009, 2010
 Kor Royal Cup (1) : 2010

External links
 Prakasit Sansook profile at Port website
 

1978 births
Living people
Pakasit Saensook
Pakasit Saensook
Association football fullbacks
Pakasit Saensook
Pakasit Saensook
Pakasit Saensook
Pakasit Saensook
Pakasit Saensook
Pakasit Saensook
Pakasit Saensook